Richard Crosse  (26 November 1669–5 June 1732) was an English priest.

Crosse was born in Thurloxton and educated at Trinity College, Oxford. He was appointed a Fellow of New College, Oxford in 1691. He held livings at Broughton, Oxfordshire and Ledbury. He became a Canon of Hereford Cathedral in 1724, and Archdeacon of Shropshire in 1727, dying in post.

References

People from Somerset
1669 births
1732 deaths
Alumni of Trinity College, Oxford
Archdeacons of Shropshire
18th-century English Anglican priests
Fellows of New College, Oxford